Soho & Winson Green was an intermediate station on the Great Western Railway's London Paddington to Birkenhead via Birmingham Snow Hill line, serving the Soho and Winson Green areas. Opened in 1854 as "Soho" station, its name was changed to "Soho and Winson Green" in May 1893, and finally to "Winson Green" on 14 June 1965, following the closure of a nearby station of that name. It was elaborately decorated and had 4 platforms. In 1972, the station closed, along with the entire line.

Soho Benson Road tram stop now sits upon the former station site, as part of the Midland Metro light-rail system.

Image gallery

References

 Soho & Winson Green station, at Warwickshire Railways.com
  (for coordinates)

Further reading

Former Great Western Railway stations
Disused railway stations in Birmingham, West Midlands
Railway stations in Great Britain opened in 1854
Railway stations in Great Britain closed in 1972